Mielikki is the Finnish goddess of forests and the hunt. She is referred to in various tales as either the wife or the daughter-in-law of Tapio, and the mother of Nyyrikki and Tuulikki. She is said to have played a central role in the creation of the bear.

In the Kalevala, the Finnish national epic based on Finnish and Karelian folklore, the hero Lemminkäinen offers her and Tapio prayers, gold and silver so he can catch the Hiisi elk. In another passage, Mielikki is asked to protect cattle grazing in the forest. In a country where the forest was central to providing food through hunting, gathering and cattle grazing, it was thought very important to stay on her good side. She is also offered prayers by those who hunt small game and those who gather mushrooms and berries.

Mielikki is known as a skillful healer who heals the paws of animals who have escaped traps, helps chicks that have fallen from their nests and treats the wounds of wood grouses after their mating displays. She knows well the healing herbs and will also help humans if they know well enough to ask her for it. Her name is derived from the old Finnish word mielu which means luck.

The Mielikki Mons, a mountain on Venus, is named after her.

External links
 Original quotes from Kalevala regarding Mielikki translated to English
 Mielikki information and links from the Finndex.

References

Finnish goddesses
Hunting goddesses
Nature goddesses
Tree goddesses
Characters in the Kalevala